Jacquie Neville (born October 21, 1987) is an Ottawa-born singer, songwriter and producer. From 2009 to 2017 she performed as the frontwoman of the Balconies. In 2022 she released her debut solo album If You Get Lonely.

Career
Neville began her music career in 2007 with the formation of the Balconies, a band she formed with her brother, Steven Neville, and Liam Jaeger. As a trio the group released the albums The Balconies (2009), and Fast Motions (2014). In 2015 Steven Neville announced his departure from the band. As a duo the Balconies would go on to release two more albums, Rhonda (2016) and Show You (2017). In 2018, the Balconies officially announced the end of their work as a band.

In 2018 Neville began releasing music as a solo artist. She released her debut single "Lead the Way" in December 2018. In 2022 she released her first album as a solo artist, If You Get Lonely.

Discography
With the Balconies
The Balconies (2009)
Fast Motions (2014)
Rhonda (2016)
Show You (2017)

As a solo artist
If You Get Lonely (2022)

References

1987 births
Singers from Ontario
Living people